Hywel ap Rhys ('Howell son of Reese') is a Welsh name that may refer to:

 Hywel ap Rhys (Glywysing), king of part or all of Glywysing (r. 886)
 Hywel ap Rhys (died 1231), later known as Hywel Sais ('Hywel the Saxon'), son of Rhys ap Gruffydd
 Hywel ap Rhys Gryg (fl. 1220s), son of Rhys Gryg (son of Rhys ap Gruffydd)